The Sac and Fox Reservation of Sauk (Sac) and Meskwaki (Fox) people is a 23.639 sq mi (61.226 km²) tract located in southeastern Richardson County, Nebraska, and northeastern Brown County, Kansas.  It governed by the Sac and Fox Nation of Missouri in Kansas and Nebraska, and the headquarters for reservation is in Reserve, Kansas.  The tribal jurisdiction area is west of White Cloud, Kansas and northeast of Hiawatha, Kansas. It was created as a consequence of the Platte Purchase of 1836.

Other reservations associated with the Sac and Fox Nation:

 Sac and Fox/Meskwaki Settlement -- located in central Iowa 
 Sac and Fox Nation in Stroud, Oklahoma, which is the largest domestic dependent nation associated with the Sauk (Sac) and Meskwaki (Fox) peoples, and covers Lincoln, Payne, and Pottawatomie counties in Oklahoma.

See also 
 Native American tribes in Nebraska

References

External links 
 Sac and Fox Reservation Tract Map from the US Census
 "2000 Census Data", Annie E. Casey Foundation.

Sac and Fox
American Indian reservations in Nebraska
Geography of Richardson County, Nebraska
Geography of Brown County, Kansas
1836 establishments in the United States
American Indian reservations in Kansas